Bruce West (born 1939, died 2021) was an American artist.

Works
 Untitled (1962), brass and copper, Portland Art Museum, Portland, Oregon
 Untitled, chromium and steel, Portland Art Museum, Portland, Oregon
 Untitled (Abstract Sculpture) (1960/2006), stainless steel, Portland Art Museum, Portland, Oregon
 Sculpture Stage (1976), Tom McCall Waterfront Park, Portland, Oregon
 Untitled (1977), Portland, Oregon
 Standing Pear and Friends and Strawberry Duo (2001), Auburn, Washington (at Auburn train station)
 Sitting Stones, East Portland Community Center, Portland, 2009
 The Cube (2015), Salem, Oregon

References

External links
 

1939 births
Living people
American artists
People from Oregon